Cosima Coppola (born October 17, 1983) is an Italian dancer and actress of cinema, theatre and television.

Career 
Cosima Coppola was born in Taranto, Apulia, but she grew in Fragagnano. When she was 19 years old, she moved to Rome to work as a dancer.

In 2003, she started to study recitation. Her television debut was on the soap opera Un Posto al Sole. After, she has had roles in several television mini-series, like Carabinieri 4 (2005), Il sangue e la rosa (2008), Il falco e la colomba (2009), Viso d'angelo (2011), Rodolfo Valentino – La leggenda (2014), Furore – Il vento della speranza (2014) and L'onore e il rispetto (2006–2012), where she played the part of Melina Bastianelli in Fortebracci.

She also appeared in the Australian film Wog Boy 2: Kings of Mykonos (2010) in the role of Enza.

Filmography

Theatre 
Odio il rosso (2007)

Film 
Wog Boy 2: Kings of Mykonos (2010)

Television 
Un Posto al Sole
Empire (2005)
Carabinieri 4 (2005)
L'onore e il rispetto (2006–2012)
Donne sbagliate (2007)
Io ti assolvo (2008)
Il sangue e la rosa (2008)
Il falco e la colomba (2009)
Viso d'angelo (2011)
Rodolfo Valentino – La leggenda (2014)
Furore – Il vento della speranza (2014)

References

External links

1983 births
Living people
Italian television actresses
Italian film actresses